is a Japanese pop rock duo who debuted in 1997. Both of the band members come from Yokohama in Kanagawa Prefecture, and attended 
Okamura Junior High School.

Yuzu started out as street musicians. At first, the band's name was "Light's", but Kitagawa disliked it, so they changed the name to "Yuzu". At that time, Kitagawa was eating a yuzu sherbet, so he named the band after the fruit (incidentally, Iwasawa was eating vanilla ice cream so the band's name might have been "Vanilla" - sometimes Iwasawa tells this story). The fans of Yuzu are called "Yuzukko (ゆずっ子)".

Members
 Yūjin Kitagawa (born January 14, 1977) – vocals, guitar, leader
 Kōji Iwasawa (born October 14, 1976) – vocals, guitar

Discography

Albums

Studio albums

Mini albums

Live albums

Compilation albums

Singles

As lead artist
 "—" denotes releases that did not chart or were not released in that region.
 "×" denotes periods where charts did not exist or were not archived.

Collaboration singles

Asia Tours
YUZU ASIA TOUR 2016 Summer 「NATSUIRO」 supported by WAKUWAKU JAPAN (2016)
YUZU ASIA TOUR 2017 (2017)
YUZU ASIA LIVE 2019 (2019)

Awards 
Japan Record Awards

The Japan Record Awards is a major music awards show held annually in Japan by the Japan Composer's Association.

|-
| 2013
| Land
| Best Album Award
| 
|-
| 2017
| Yuzu
| Special Award
| 
|}

Space Shower Music Video Awards

|-
| 1998
| Natsuiro (夏色)
| Best Your Choice
| 
|-
| 1999
| Sentimental (センチメンタル)
| Best Your Choice
| 
|-
| 2000
| Tobenai Tori (飛べない鳥)
| Best Your Choice
| 
|-
| 2014
| Yuzu
| Best Artist
| 
|-
| 2016
| Owaranai Uta (終わらない歌)
| Best Video of the Year
| 
|-
| 2018
| Yuzu
| Artist of the Year
|
|}

Notes

References

External links

  
 
 
 Toy's Factory official profile 
 Avex Taiwan profile 

1996 establishments in Japan
Musical groups established in 1996
Folk music groups
Japanese musical duos
Japanese pop rock music groups
Toy's Factory artists
Avex Group artists
Musical groups from Kanagawa Prefecture